Chaudhry Khalid Mehmood Jajja is a Pakistani politician who was a Member of the Provincial Assembly of the Punjab, from May 2013 to May 2018.

Early life and education
He was born on 4 December 1969 in Bahawalpur.

He graduated in 1991 from Govt. Sadiq Egerton College Bahawalpur and has a degree of Bachelor of Arts.

Political career

He was elected to the Provincial Assembly of the Punjab as a candidate of Pakistan Muslim League (Nawaz) from Constituency PP-275 (Bahawalpur-IX) in 2013 Pakistani general election.

In December 2013, he was appointed as Parliamentary Secretary for irrigation.

References

Living people
Punjab MPAs 2013–2018
1969 births
Pakistan Muslim League (N) politicians